Political parties in  Saint-Barthélemy lists political parties in Saint Barthélemy.

The parties
Saint Barth First!/UMP (Saint-Barth d’abord!, Bruno Magras)
All United for Saint Barthélemy (Tous unis pour St-Barthélemy, Karine Miot-Richard)
Action Balance and Transparence (Action Équilibre et Transparence, Maxime Desouches)
Together for Saint Barthélemy (Ensemble pour St-Barthélemy, Benoît Chauvin)

See also

 Lists of political parties

 
Saint-Barth
Political parties
+Saint Bathelemy
Saint Barthelemy

Political parties